Actv S.p.A. (Azienda del Consorzio Trasporti Veneziano) is a public company responsible for public transportation in Venice and Chioggia municipalities and for interurban bus services in province of Venice. ACTV is not responsible for Venice People Mover (managed by AVM) and waterbus routes between airport and the lagoon area (managed by Alilaguna). Connections by bus with Venice airport are managed by ACTV and by ATVO.

Network

Venice municipality

Lagoon area
The main public transportation means are motorised waterbuses (vaporetti), which ply regular routes along the Grand Canal and between the city's islands.

Lido and Pellestrina islands
Lido and Pellestrina are two islands forming a barrier between the southern Venetian Lagoon and the Adriatic Sea. On those islands road traffic is allowed. There are bus services and waterbus services linking the islands with other islands (Venice, Murano, Burano) and with the peninsula of Cavallino-Treporti.

Mainland
The mainland of Venice is composed of 4 boroughs: Mestre-Carpenedo, Marghera, Chirignago-Zelarino and Favaro Veneto. Mestre is the center and the most populated urban area of the mainland of Venice. There are several bus routes and two tramway lines. Several bus routes link the mainland with piazzale Roma, the main bus station in Venice, via Ponte della Libertà a road bridge connecting the historical center of the city of Venice to the mainland.

Tram Routes

T1 Venice Piazzale Roma-Mestre Centro-Monte Calo (Favaro Veneto)
T2 Salamonio (Marghera)-Mestre Centro

Waterbus Routes

1 Piazzale Roma-Ferrovia-San Marco-Rialto-San Marco-Lido di Venezia Santa Maria Elisabetta
2 San Marco - San Zaccaria-Giudecca-Tronchetto-Piazzale Roma-Ferrovia-Rialto
2/ Piazzale Roma-Ferrovia-Rialto
3 Piazzale Roma-Ferrovia-Murano-Ferrovia-Piazzale Roma
4.1 Murano-Fondamente Nove-Ferrovia-Piazzale Roma-Giudecca-San Zaccaria-Fondamente Nove-Murano
4.2 Murano-Fondamente Nove-San Zaccaria-Giudecca-Piazzale Roma-Ferrovia-Fondamente Nove-Murano
5.1 Lido di Venezia Santa Maria Elisabetta-Ospedale-Fondamente Nove-Ferrovia-Piazzale Roma-San Marco - San Zaccaria-Lido di Venezia Santa Maria Elisabetta
5.2 Lido di Venezia-San Marco - San Zaccaria-Piazzale Roma-Ferrovia-Fondamente Nove-Ospedale-Lido di Venezia Santa Maria Elisabetta
6 Piazzale Roma-Santa Marta-San Basilio-Zattere-Spirito Santo-Giardini Biennale-Sant'Elena-Lido di Venezia Santa Maria Elisabetta
9 Burano-Torcello
10 Lido di Venezia Santa Maria Elisabetta-San Marco Giardinetti-Zattere-Lido di Venezia Santa Maria Elisabetta
11 Lido di Venezia Santa Maria Elisabetta-Alberoni Faro Rocchetta-Santa Maria del Mare-Pellestrina-Chioggia
12 Venezia Fondamente Nove-Murano-Mazzorbo-(Torcello)-Burano-Treporti-Punta Sabbioni
13 Venezia Fondamente Nove-Murano-Vignole-Sant'Erasmo-Treporti
14 Venezia San Zaccaria-Lido di Venezia Santa Maria Elisabetta-Punta Sabbioni-(Burano)
15 Venezia San Zaccaria-Punta Sabbioni
16 Venezia Zattere-Fusina
17 Tronchetto-Lido San Niccolò
20 San Marco - San Zaccaria-San Servolo-San Lazzaro-San Servolo-San Marco - San Zaccaria
22 Punta Sabbioni-Ospedale-Fondamente Nove-Tre Archi
N San Marco - San Zaccaria-Canale della Giudecca-Canal Grande-Lido di Venezia Santa Maria Elisabetta
NLN Venezia Fondamente Nove-Sant'Erasmo-Burano-Punta Sabbioni
NMU Fondamente Nove-Murano-Fondamente Nove

Mestre Urban Bus Routes

2 Venice-Della Libertà-Mestre FS-Circonvallazione-Torre Belfredo-Pasqualigo-Viale Don Sturzo
3 SFMR Ospedale-Torre Belfredo-Circonvallazione-Piazza Sant'Antonio-Catene-Villabona
4 Venice-Mestre Centro-Favaro-Via Altinia
4L Venice-Mestre Centro
5 Venice-San Giuliano-Villaggio Laguna-Tessera-Aeroporto Marco Polo
6 Venice-Piazza Sant'Antonio-Catene-Chirignago-Spinea
6L Venice-Piazza Sant'Antonio-Via Correnti
7 Venice-Della Libertà-Chirignago-Spinea-Viale San Remo-Via Martiri della Libertà
7L Venice-Mestre-Brendole
8B Marocco-Brendole-Via Risorgimento
9 San Liberale-Marcon-Marcon SFMR-Dese-Altinia-Forte Marghera-Mestre Centro-Via Tevere
9H Ospedale-Mestre Centro-Piazzale Zendrini
10 Asseggiano-Quarnaro-Mattuglie-Mestre FS-Mattuglie-Asseggiano
12L Venice-San Giuliano-Piazza 27 Ottobre
13 Via Cavergnago-Marghera-Via Arduino
15 Aeroporto Marco Polo-Tessera-Forte Marghera-Piazza 27 Ottobre-Mestre FS-Via Torino (Università)
16 Rizzardi-Piazza Sant'Antonio-Malcontenta-Moranzani
18 Mestre FS-Malcontenta-Ca' Sabbioni
19 Venice-Campalto-Favaro-Via Altinia
20 Martellago-Zelarino-Mestre Centro
21 Martellago-Maerne FS-Maerne-Zelarino-Mestre Centro
24 Venice-San Giuliano-Pertini-Bissuola-Casona-Pertini-San Giuliano-Venice
24B Venice-San Giuliano-Pertini-Bissuola
24H Venice-Pertini-Casona-SFMR Ospedale-Don Tosatto
31 Pertini (Istituto Foscari)-Bissuola-Mestre FS
31H Ospedale-Don Tosatto-Don Peron-Circonvallazione-Mestre FS-Via Torino (Università)-Forte Marghera-Pertini-Bissuola-Mestre Centro-Torre Belfredo-Ospedale
32H Ospedale-Torre Belfredo-Mestre Centro-Bissuola-Pertini-Forte Marghera-Via Torino (Università)-Mestre FS-Circonvallazione-Don Peron-Don Tosatto-Ospedale
33H Ospedale-Castellana-Mestre FS-Bissuola-Via Cavergnago
34H Ospedale-Terraglio-Mestre FS-Bissuola-Via Cavegnago
43 Venice-Della Libertà-San Giuliano-Forte Marghera-Via Torino (Università)-Ca' Marcello-Mestre FS
45 Favaro-Tessera-Aeroporto Marco Polo-Ca' Noghera
45H Ospedale-Favaro-Tessera-Ca' Noghera
47H Asseggiano-SFMR Spinea-Chirignago-Mattuglie-Zelarino-Ospedale
48H Martellago-Maerne-Terraglio-Ospedale-Mestre Centro
53 Piazza 27 Ottobre-Mestre FS-Malcontenta
56 Venice-Malcontenta-Ca' Bertelle
66 Venice-Catene-Chirignago
80 Venice-Mestre-Trivignano-Maerne-Martellago
81F Rizzardi-Piazza Sant'Antonio-Cimitero-Rizzardi
84 Venice-Favaro-Dese FS
86 Mestre FS-Vempa-Banchina dell'Azoto
N1 Venice-Piazza 27 Ottobre-Mestre FS-Venice
N2 Venice-Piazza Sant'Antonio-Venice
N3 Mestre Centro-Torre Belfredo-Ospedale-Don Tosatto-Don Peron-Terraglio-Mestre Centro
N4 Mestre Centro-Torre Belfredo-Ospedale-Zelarino-Trivignano-Martellago-Maerne-Zelarino-Ospedale-Mestre Centro
N5 Mestre Centro-Piazza Sant'Antonio-Chirignago-Spinea-Chirignago-Mestre Centro
CSMN Istituto Foscari-Gritti-Barbarigo-Stefanini-Zuccante-Bruno-Pacinotti
CSMS Istituto Gramsci-Morin-Volta-San Marco

Chioggia Urban Bus Routes

1 Isola Unione-Campo Marconi-Borgo San Giovanni-Madonna Marina-Momolo-Isola Unione
2 Isola Unione-Madonna Marina-Borgo San Giovanni-Campo Marconi-Isola Unione
3 Ca' Bianca-Parco Clodì-Brondolo-Mediterraneo-Lungomare-Isola Unione
4 Cavanella-Brondolo-Mediterraneo-Lungomare-Isola Unione
5 Isola Verde-Brondolo-Mediterraneo-Lungomare-Isola Unione
6 Isola Unione-Momolo-Lungomare-Mediterraneo-Borgo San Giovanni-Campo Marconi
7 Campo Marconi-Borgo San Giovanni-Mediterraneo-Lungomare-Momolo-Isola Unione
21 Isola Unione-Madonna Marina-Ridotto Madonna-Brondolo-Centro Clodì-Brondolo-Ridotto Madonna-Madonna Marina-Isola Unione

Lido Urban Bus Routes

A Klinger-Piazzale Santa Maria Elisabetta-Via Sandro Gallo-Ca' Bianca-Malamocco-Alberoni-Faro Rocchetta
B Piazzale Santa Maria Elisabetta-Via Sandro Gallo-Ca' Bianca-Malamocco
C Piazzale Santa Maria Elisabetta-Via Sandro Gallo-Piazzale Torta-Via Sandro Gallo-Piazzale Santa Maria Elisabetta
CA Piazzale Santa Maria Elisabetta-Via Sandro Gallo-Lungomare Marconi-Gran Viale Santa Maria Elisabetta-Piazzale Santa Maria Elisabetta
CO Piazzale Santa Maria Elisabetta-Gran Viale Santa Maria Elisabetta-Lungomare Marconi-Via Sandro Gallo-Piazzale Santa Maria Elisabetta
N Piazzale Santa Maria Elisabetta-Via Sandro Gallo-Ca' Bianca-Malamocco-Alberoni-Faro Rocchetta-Santa Maria del Mare-Pellestrina
V Piazzale Santa Maria Elisabetta-Gran Viale Santa Maria Elisabetta-Lungomare Marconi-Colombo-Via Parri

Suburban Bus Routes

2E Rio San Martino-Scorzè
3E Borgoricco-Sant'Angelo-Veternigo-Zianigo-Mirano
4E Noale-Salzano-Mirano
4DE Noale-Salzano-Mirano-Catene-Venice
5E Noale-Robegano-Maerne-Olmo-Zelarino-Mestre Centro
6E Scorzè-Martellago-Trivignano-Zelarino-Mestre Centro
7E Mirano-Orgnano-Spinea-Chirignago-Mestre-Venice
7DE Mirano-Spinea-Catene-Venice
8E Treviso-Preganziol-Mogliano Veneto-Marocco-Mestre Centro
8AE Via Mattei - Marcon-Mogliano Veneto-Mestre Centro
9E Badoere/Zero Branco-Mogliano Veneto
10E Mirano-Campocroce-Scaltenigo-Ballò-Vetrego-Marano-Mirano
11E Mirano-Maerne-Martellago-Scorzè
12E Scorzè-Cappella-Peseggia-Gardigiano-Mogliano Veneto/Venice
14E Casale sul Sile-Quarto d'Altino-Gaggio-Marcon-Mogliano Veneto
16E Trebaseleghe-Scorzè
17E Caltana-Caselle-Santa Maria in Sala-Mirano
53E Padua-Stra-Fiesso-Dolo-Mira-Oriago-Marghera-Venice
54E Corte-Bojon-Premaore-Camponogara-Dolo/Mestre/Venice
55E Celeseo/Stra-Vigonovo-Galta-Fosso'-Camponogara-Dolo
55SE Dolo-Paluello-San Pietro di Stra-Stra
56E Dolo-Sambruson-Piazza Vecchia-Gambrare-Mira-Mirano-Marano
57E Mellaredo-Pianiga-Marano-Oriago-Mestre/Venice
58E Adria-Cavarzere-Piove di Sacco-Campolongo Maggiore-Fosso'-Dolo
58RE Adria-Cavarzere-Piove di Sacco-Campolongo Maggiore-Fosso'-Dolo
59E Dolo-Cazzago-Scaltenigo-Marano-Mirano
60E Cavarzere/Boscochiaro-Rottanova-Piove di Sacco-Stra
66E Mellaredo-Pianiga-Arino-Cazzago-Dolo
67E Piove di Sacco-Corte-Bojon-Campagna Lupia-Calcroci-Dolo
67RE Piove di Sacco-Corte-Bojon-Calcroci-Venice
72E Pettorazza Grimani-Cavarzere
73E Rottanova-Cavarzere
81E Sottomarina-Chioggia-San Pietro-Boscochiaro-Cavarzere
82E Sottomarina-Camponogara-Fosso'-San Pietro di Stra-Stra-Dolo
83E Cavarzere-Ca' Labia-Ca' Matte-Ca' Briani-Acquamarza-Grignella
HE Noale-Robegano-Salzano-Mirano (Ospedale)-Maerne FS-Martellago-Via Castellana-Martellago
Route for Mirano's Schools
Route for Mogliano Veneto's Schools
Route for Piove di Sacco's Schools
Route for Dolo's Schools
Route for Adria's Schools
Route for ENAIP Noale

Omnibus Shuttle

Dolo Dolo-Cazzago-Dolo FS
Mira Mira Buse FS-Mira-Mira Mirano FS
Mirano Mirano Ospedale-Mira Mirano FS

Notes

See also 
Piers in Venice
Vaporetto

Companies based in Venice
Transport in Venice